The 1964 Italian Grand Prix was a Formula One motor race held at the Autodromo Nazionale di Monza on September 6, 1964. It was race 8 of 10 in both the 1964 World Championship of Drivers and the 1964 International Cup for Formula One Manufacturers. The 78-lap race was won by Ferrari driver John Surtees after he started from pole position. Bruce McLaren finished second for the Cooper team and Ferrari driver Lorenzo Bandini came in third.

Classification

Qualifying

Race 

Jean-Claude Rudaz, who had qualified 20th fastest, was unable to start the race after blowing up his engine and was replaced by Maurice Trintignant, who had qualified 21st fastest. This was the final start of Trintignant's 15 year Formula 1 career.

Championship standings after the race 

Drivers' Championship standings

Constructors' Championship standings

 Notes: Only the top five positions are included for both sets of standings. Only best 6 results counted toward the championship. Numbers without parentheses are championship points, numbers in parentheses are total points scored.

References

External links 
 1964 Italian Grand Prix at statsf1.com
 1964 Italian Grand Prix at grandprix.com

Italian Grand Prix
Italian Grand Prix
1964 in Italian motorsport